Aleksa Amanović (born 24 October 1996) is a Macedonian professional footballer who plays as a defender for Astana in the Kazakhstan Premier League.

Club career
Amanović is product of FK Partizan academy where he played until he made his senior debut in the season 2014–15 playing on loan at Partizan satellite team FK Teleoptik.

After playing half season with FK IMT in the Serbian League Belgrade, Amanović signed during the winter-break of the 2015–16 Serbian SuperLiga season with FK Javor Ivanjica.

Kazakhstan
On 17 February 2020, Tobol announced the signing of Amanović to a one-year contract, with the option of an additional year. On 15 January 2023, Tobol announced the departure of Amanović. Two days later, 17 January 2023, Amanović signed for Astana.

International career
He played for Macedonia U19 and U21 national teams.

Honours
Tobol
Kazakhstan Premier League: 2021
Kazakhstan Super Cup: 2022

Astana
Kazakhstan Super Cup: 2023

References

1996 births
Living people
Footballers from Belgrade
Macedonian people of Serbian descent
Association football defenders
Macedonian footballers
North Macedonia youth international footballers
North Macedonia under-21 international footballers
FK Partizan players
FK Teleoptik players
FK Javor Ivanjica players
FC Tobol players
Serbian SuperLiga players
Kazakhstan Premier League players
Macedonian expatriate footballers
Expatriate footballers in Kazakhstan
Macedonian expatriate sportspeople in Kazakhstan